Mastiff LLC is an American video game publisher. Founded in 2002 with headquarters in San Francisco and Tokyo, the company has released titles in virtually every genre – including action, adventure, RPG, FPS, party, horror, and music. The executive staff includes Bill Swartz, Mika Hayashi, and Brian Bezdek.

Published games
Mastiff has published over 30 games since 2006, with titles ranging from arcade shooter to tactical RPG. First-person horror puzzle title Home Sweet Home (2017), Yggdrazil Group's first foray into game development, received positive reviews for its use of Thai folklore and fresh take on the horror genre. La Pucelle: Tactics (2002) is a tactical RPG by Nippon Ichi, known for its strong battle mechanics and compelling storyline. While often favorably compared to Disgaea, La Pucelle was in fact released first. The Heavy Fire series, developed by Polish group Teyon, are on-rail arcade shooters set in Somalia, South America, Afghanistan, and North Korea, respectively. The most recent addition to the series, Red Shadow, is available in VR for the PS4. Gurumin: A Monstrous Adventure is an action RPG best known for solid real-time action mechanics and excellent audio that features several well-known voice actors. Most recently, Fight Crab (2019) is a 3D action game for the Switch, based on an animated GIF.

References

External links
 

Video game companies established in 2002
Video game companies of Japan
Video game companies of the United States
Video game publishers
2002 establishments in California